This page details the all-time statistics, records, and other achievements pertaining to the KK Partizan. Partizan is the professional basketball club based in Belgrade, Serbia.  The club competes in the Basketball League of Serbia, Adriatic League and Euroleague.  Partizan has won as many as 44 trophies, and it is most successful basketball club in Serbia.

Honours

Total titles: 47

Individual awards

International record

Road to the 1992 Euroleague victory

Domestic record

Regional record

Adriatic League

The biggest wins in Adriatic League

Home wins

Away wins

Positions by year 

Longest winning streak
15 games in the 2007–08 season.
Longest losing streak
4 games in the 2015–16 season.
Most Won Games in a Season
 24 out of 26 games for the 2007–08 season.
Most Lost Games in a Season
 Lost 14 out of 26 games for the 2015–16 season.

Player records

*Players in bold are still active

Records in EuroLeague

NBA

Players in the NBA Draft

Moved to an NBA team

Signed from an NBA team

External links
 Official website

KK Partizan
P